Last Chance may refer to:

Film 
 The Last Chance (1926 film), an American silent western film directed by Horace B. Carpenter
 The Last Chance (1937 film), a British drama directed by Thomas Bentley
 The Last Chance (1945 film), a Swiss war film directed by Leopold Lindtberg
 The Last Chance (1968 film), an Italian spy film starring Tab Hunter
 Last Chance (1973 film) or Stateline Motel, an Italian crime film directed by Maurizio Lucidi 
 Last Chance, a 1999 drama directed by Bryan Cranston
 Last Chance (2012 film), a Canadian documentary
 The Last Chance: Diary of Comedians or Bokutachi no Koukan Nikki, a 2014 Japanese film directed by Teruyoshi Uchimura
 Last Chance (2016 film), an Australian drama short film

Music 
 "Last Chance" (Ginuwine song)
 "Last Chance", a song by Allure from Allure
 "Last Chance", a song by Kaskade from Atmosphere
 "Last Chance", a song by Kylie Minogue from Disco
 "Last Chance", a song by Level 42 from The Pursuit of Accidents
 "Last Chance", a song by Maroon 5 from Hands All Over
 "Last Chance", a song by Moke from Shorland
 "Last Chance", a song by Nicki Minaj from Pink Friday
 "Last Chance", a song by Night Ranger from Feeding off the Mojo
 "Last Chance", a song by Shooting Star from Shooting Star

Places 
 Last Chance, California
 Last Chance, Colorado
 Last Chance, Idaho
 Last Chance, Iowa
 Last Chance, North Carolina
 Last Chance, Oklahoma
 Last Chance Creek (disambiguation)
 Last Chance Range, California
 Last Chance Range (Nevada)
 Last Chance Saloon, a popular name for bars near the border of an area where alcoholic beverages are scarce

Other uses 
 Last Chance (Mars), a rock outcrop on the planet Mars
 Last Chance (fireboat), built by MetalCraft Marine, for Clayton, NY

See also
 Last Chance, No Breaks, an album by Jamal Phillips
 Last Chance U, an American documentary television series
 The Last Chancers, a 2002 British sitcom
 Last clear chance, a legal doctrine 
 One Last Chance (disambiguation)